WSA KTM Graz is a UCI Continental team founded in 2011 and based in Austria. It participates in UCI Continental Circuits races.

Team roster

Major wins
2011
GP Betonexpressz 2000, Martin Schoffmann
2013
Tour Bohemia, Josef Benetseder
2017
Stage 3b Tour of Szeklerland, Markus Kopfauf
2018
Stage 2b (ITT) Tour of Bihor, Jodok Salzmann
GP Kranj, Daniel Auer
2019
Prologue Oberösterreichrundfahrt, Lukas Schlemmer
V4 Special Series Vasarosnameny - Nyiregyhaza, Daniel Auer
Stage 3b Cycling Tour of Szeklerland, Felix Ritzinger
2020
 National Road Race, Valentin Götzinger
2021
Stage 3 Belgrade Banjaluka, Daniel Auer
Stage 4 Tour of Szeklerland, Daniel Auer
2022
Umag Trophy, Daniel Auer
GP Slovenian Istria, Daniel Auer

National and world champions

2020
 Austria Road Race, Valentin Götzinger

References

External links

UCI Continental Teams (Europe)
Cycling teams based in Austria
Cycling teams established in 2011
2011 establishments in Austria